Anastasiya Zimiankova is a Belarusian freestyle wrestler. She won the silver medal in the 72 kg event at the 2018 European Wrestling Championships held in Kaspiysk, Russia.

Career 

At the 2018 European U23 Wrestling Championship held in Istanbul, Turkey, she won the silver medal in the 72 kg event. In the final, she lost against Koumba Larroque of France.

She competed in the 72 kg event at the 2019 European Wrestling Championships and in that same event at the 2020 European Wrestling Championships without winning a medal.

In May 2021, she failed to qualify for the 2020 Summer Olympics at the World Olympic Qualification Tournament held in Sofia, Bulgaria. In October 2021, she competed in the 72 kg event at the World Wrestling Championships held in Oslo, Norway where she was eliminated in her second match by eventual bronze medalist Buse Tosun of Turkey. A month later, she lost her bronze medal match in the 72 kg event at the 2021 U23 World Wrestling Championships held in Belgrade, Serbia.

Major results

References

External links 

 

Living people
Year of birth missing (living people)
Place of birth missing (living people)
Belarusian female sport wrestlers
European Wrestling Championships medalists
21st-century Belarusian women